845 Naëma (prov. designation:  or ) is a large asteroid and the parent body of the Naëma family located in the outer regions of the asteroid belt. It was discovered on 16 November 1916, by astronomer Max Wolf at the Heidelberg-Königstuhl State Observatory in southwest Germany. Any reference of the asteroid's name to a person is unknown.

Orbit and classification 

Naëma is the parent body of the Naëma family, a smaller family of little more than 300 carbonaceous asteroids, when applying the hierarchical clustering method. This asteroid family is widely recognized by a number of Solar System dynamicists including Zappalà, Nesvorný, as well as Milani and Knežević (AstDyS) The family was first detected by Vincenzo Zappalà in 1994/95.

Naëma orbits the Sun in the outer asteroid belt at a distance of 2.7–3.1 AU once every 5.04 years (1,840 days; semi-major axis of 2.94 AU). Its orbit has an eccentricity of 0.07 and an inclination of 13° with respect to the ecliptic.

Naming 

Naëma is a German variant of the biblical name Naomi. However, any reference of this minor planet name to a person or occurrence is unknown.

Unknown meaning 

Among the many thousands of named minor planets, Naëma is one of 120 asteroids for which no official naming citation has been published. All of these asteroids have low numbers, the first being . They were discovered between 1876 and the 1930s, predominantly by astronomers Auguste Charlois, Johann Palisa, Max Wolf and Karl Reinmuth.

Physical characteristics 

In the Bus–Binzel SMASS classification, Naëma is a common, carbonaceous C-type asteroid, which is the overall spectral type of the Naëma family.

Rotation period 

In September 2006, a rotational lightcurve of Naëma was obtained from photometric observations by Collin Bembrick at the Mount Tarana Observatory , Australia, in collaboration with Bill Allen and Greg Bolt. Lightcurve analysis gave a relatively long rotation period of  hours with a brightness variation of  magnitude. In December 2017, French amateur astronomer René Roy determined a lower-rated, tentative period of  hours with an amplitude of  magnitude.

Diameter and albedo 

The Collaborative Asteroid Lightcurve Link derives an albedo of 0.0503 and a diameter of 54.05 kilometers based on an absolute magnitude of 10.2.

Several asteroid occultations of Naëma have been observed between 2002 and 2010. These timed observations are taken when the asteroid passes in front of a distant star.

References

External links 
 Lightcurve Database Query (LCDB), at www.minorplanet.info
 Dictionary of Minor Planet Names, Google books
 Asteroids and comets rotation curves, CdR – Geneva Observatory, Raoul Behrend
 Discovery Circumstances: Numbered Minor Planets (1)-(5000) – Minor Planet Center
 
 

000845
Discoveries by Max Wolf
Named minor planets
000845
19161116